This is a list of players who earned caps for the Portugal national futsal team.

As of February 2021, 151 different players have played for Portugal. The record for the most caps is held by Arnaldo Pereira with 208 between 1999 and 2016, overtaking André Lima's previous record of 111 caps on 13 January 2009.

The first player to reach 50 caps was Vitinha on 30 June 2002. The first player to reach 100 caps was André Lima on 14 October 2006, and the other players with 100 caps or more are Arnaldo Pereira, João Benedito, Ricardinho, Gonçalo Alves, Pedro Cary, João Matos, Joel Queirós, Bebé, Fernando Cardinal, Pedro Costa, Bruno Coelho, Ivan Dias, and Israel Alves. João Benedito is also the most capped Portuguese goalkeeper with 181 caps to his name from 2000 to 2014.

Players
Players are listed by number of caps, then number of goals scored. If number of goals are equal, the players are then listed alphabetically. Statistics correct as of 27 February 2021.
Players in bold are still active for the national team.

References